Ane Carmen Stuve Roggen (born 16 September 1978)  is a Norwegian singer, conductor, arranger, and journalist. She is the younger sister of jazz singer Live Maria Roggen and the twin sister of jazz singer Ida Roggen.

Education 

Roggen attended the music program at Foss videregaende skole and received her Examen artium in 1994. She received a master's degree in musicology from the University of Oslo and wrote the thesis Wayfaring Voices: Discursions into Black Vocal Style in a Norwegian Context (2008). She also studied at CUNY Graduate Center in New York City and Universidad de Guanajuato in Guanajuato, Mexico (2000–01).

Career 
Roggen is a producer at Rikskonsertene and became popular in Norway as a member of the vocal group Pitsj. She recorded the album Pitsj (2006), followed by competing in Kjempesjansen at NRK with Tora Augestad, Anine Kruse, Benedikte Kruse and her twin sister Ida. Roggen joined the vocal group Quattro Stagioni for the album Nowell Sing We (2004) followed by a Christmas show in 2006.

Publications

Discography

As leader
With Pitsj
 Pitsj (Grappa, 2006)
 Gjenfortellinger (Grappa, 2009)
 Snow (Grappa, 2014)

As guest
 Kjell Karlsen, Edvard Grieg in jazz mood (Universal, 2008)
 Lars Klevstrand, Nomadesongar (Grappa, 2004)
 Quattro Stagioni, Nowell Sing We (Pro Musica, 2004)

References

External links 
 
Pitsj - plateslipp på Parkteateret at MIC.no, 2006 (in Norwegian)

1978 births
Living people
Musicians from Oslo
20th-century Norwegian women singers
20th-century Norwegian singers
21st-century Norwegian women singers
21st-century Norwegian singers
Norwegian women jazz singers
Pitsj members
University of Oslo alumni